Arras is a village and a former municipality in the Dibër County, northeastern Albania. At the 2015 local government reform it became a subdivision of the municipality Dibër. The population in 2011 was 3,055.

References

Former municipalities in Dibër County
Administrative units of Dibër (municipality)
Villages in Dibër County